The 1982–83 QMJHL season was the 14th season in the history of the Quebec Major Junior Hockey League. The league undergoes its first expansion since the 1973–74 QMJHL season by adding two new teams in Drummondville and Longueuil. Divisions are restored, and eleven teams played 70 games each in the regular season.

Rookie centreman Pat LaFontaine of the Verdun Juniors posts 234 points in the regular season, the second highest season total in junior ice hockey history at the time, behind only Pierre Larouche's 251 points from the 1973–74 QMJHL season. LaFontaine would go on to win six individual trophies at the season's end.

The Longueuil Chevaliers coached by Jacques Lemaire, set the Canadian Hockey League record for the best first season by an expansion team posting 37 wins and a winning percentage of 0.557 in 70 games, ahead of the 2003–04 Everett Silvertips with 35 wins and a winning percentage of 0.556 in 72 games. The Chevaliers also became the first expansion team to reach the championship series of the playoffs, a feat later equalled by the Silvertips.

The Laval Voisins and Shawinigan Cataractes both set a QMJHL record with 33 wins on home ice during the regular season. The Laval Voisins finished first overall in the regular season, winning the Jean Rougeau Trophy. The Verdun Juniors won the President's Cup, defeating the Longueuil Chevaliers in the finals.

Team changes
 The Sherbrooke Castors relocate to Saint-Jean-sur-Richelieu, becoming the Saint-Jean Castors.
 The Montreal Juniors relocate to Verdun becoming the Verdun Juniors.
 The Drummondville Voltigeurs join the league as an expansion franchise.
 The Longueuil Chevaliers join the league as an expansion franchise.

Final standings
Note: GP = Games played; W = Wins; L = Losses; T = Ties; Pts = Points; GF = Goals for; GA = Goals against

complete list of standings.

Scoring leaders
Note: GP = Games played; G = Goals; A = Assists; Pts = Points; PIM = Penalties in Minutes

 complete scoring statistics

Playoffs
Pat LaFontaine was the leading scorer of the playoffs with 35 points (11 goals, 24 assists).

Quarterfinals
 Laval Voisins defeated Hull Olympiques 4 games to 3.
 Shawinigan Cataractes defeated Saint-Jean Castors 4 games to 0.
 Verdun Juniors defeated Trois-Rivières Draveurs 4 games to 0.
 Longueuil Chevaliers defeated Chicoutimi Saguenéens 4 games to 1.

Semifinals
 Longueuil Chevaliers defeated Laval Voisins 4 games to 1.
 Verdun Juniors defeated Shawinigan Cataractes 4 games to 2.

Finals
 Verdun Juniors defeated Longueuil Chevaliers 4 games to 1.

All-star teams
First team
 Goaltender - Mario Gosselin, Shawinigan Cataractes 
 Left defence - J. J. Daigneault, Longueuil Chevaliers
 Right defence - Michel Petit, Saint-Jean Castors
 Left winger - Sylvain Turgeon, Hull Olympiques 
 Centreman - Pat LaFontaine, Verdun Juniors
 Right winger - Bobby Mormina, Longueuil Chevaliers 
 Coach - Jacques Lemaire, Longueuil Chevaliers
Second team
 Goaltender - Luc Guenette, Quebec Remparts  
 Left defence - Jocelyn Gauvreau, Granby Bisons
 Right defence - Bobby Dollas, Laval Voisins 
 Left winger - Claude Vilgrain, Laval Voisins & Ronald Choules, Trois-Rivières Draveurs
 Centreman - Mario Lemieux, Laval Voisins
 Right winger - Denis Dore, Chicoutimi Saguenéens
 Coach - Ron Lapointe, Shawinigan Cataractes
 List of First/Second/Rookie team all-stars.

Trophies and awards
Team
President's Cup - Playoff Champions, Verdun Juniors
Jean Rougeau Trophy - Regular Season Champions, Laval Voisins
Robert Lebel Trophy - Team with best GAA, Shawinigan Cataractes

Player
Michel Brière Memorial Trophy - Most Valuable Player, Pat LaFontaine, Verdun Juniors
Jean Béliveau Trophy - Top Scorer, Pat LaFontaine, Verdun Juniors
Guy Lafleur Trophy - Playoff MVP, Pat LaFontaine, Verdun Juniors
Jacques Plante Memorial Trophy - Best GAA, Tony Haladuick, Laval Voisins
Emile Bouchard Trophy - Defenceman of the Year, J. J. Daigneault, Longueuil Chevaliers
Mike Bossy Trophy - Best Pro Prospect, Pat LaFontaine, Verdun Juniors & Sylvain Turgeon, Hull Olympiques
Michel Bergeron Trophy - Offensive Rookie of the Year, Pat LaFontaine, Verdun Juniors
Raymond Lagacé Trophy - Defensive Rookie of the Year, Bobby Dollas, Laval Voisins 
Frank J. Selke Memorial Trophy - Most sportsmanlike player, Pat LaFontaine, Verdun Juniors
Marcel Robert Trophy - Best Scholastic Player, Claude Gosselin, Quebec Remparts

See also
1983 Memorial Cup
1983 NHL Entry Draft
1982–83 OHL season
1982–83 WHL season

References
 Official QMJHL Website
 www.hockeydb.com/

Quebec Major Junior Hockey League seasons
QMJHL